Conservative Laestadianism is the largest branch of the Lutheran revival movement Laestadianism. It has spread to 16 countries. As of 2012 there were about 115,000 Conservative Laestadians, most of them in Finland, the United States, Norway, and Sweden. The movement and this denomination attribute their teachings to the Bible and the Lutheran Book of Concord.

History
Laestadianism received its name from Pastor Lars Levi Laestadius. The origin of the denomination's name from the Finnish-based word Conservative ("vanhoillis-") is unknown. In North and South America as well as in Africa this denomination is known as the Laestadian Lutheran Movement.

The movement began in Swedish Lapland. Laestadius met a Sami woman named Milla Clementsdotter of Föllinge, during an 1844 inspection tour of Åsele. Clementsdotter recited various biblical teachings to Laestadius. This was an important meeting for Laestadius because afterwards he felt he understood the secret of living faith. He believed that he received the forgiveness for his sins and saw the way that led to the eternal life. His sermons underwent a marked transformation, and the movement began to spread from Sweden to Finland and Norway.

Divisions
At the beginning of the 20th century, Laestadianism broke into three branches: The Firstborn Laestadianism, Reawakening and Conservative Laestadianism. After this major schism, several other groups have also departed from Conservative Laestadianism. It nevertheless remains the largest branch of Laestadianism.

Dissociation and exclusivity
Conservative Laestadianism's leadership rigidly adheres to the teaching that all other Christian groups, including other Laestadian sub-groups, even those doctrinally identical to Conservative Laestadians, are heretical and have no place in the Kingdom of Heaven.

Doctrine

The central teaching of Conservative Laestadianism, like the movement as a whole, is the declaration of forgiveness of sins whereby members proclaim to one another, "You can believe all sins forgiven in Jesus' name and precious blood," or similar words. Upon receiving this rite, a believer is said to receive the Holy Spirit allowing him or her to be saved from eternal damnation on the basis that God forgets all sins when they have been forgiven.  This rite is also called the power of the "keys of the kingdom."

Conservative Laestadians believe that God has given the gift of faith to every child born in the world, although in their world view only Conservative Laestadians actually accept the gift.

Conservative Laestadians often have large families due to their belief that contraception is a sin. They believe that God is the lord of birth and death. They do not have a television at home because of the showing of what is viewed as offensive and sinful programing. They do not drink alcohol or listen to pop music. Recently however, the Internet is blurring the line between television and no television as many watch television programming on the Internet. Conservative Laestadians have about 780 preachers and 120 priests. LLC has about 68 preachers. All preachers among Conservative Laestadianism are men.

Distribution

Conservative Laestadianism is located mainly in northern Europe and North America. Small congregations can be found in Africa, southern Europe and South America.  There are about 115,000 Conservative Laestadians, most of them in Finland, United States and Sweden. Most (80,000-150,000) are in Finland. Conservative Laestadians organize big summer services every year. It is the biggest religious event in Nordic countries. About 70,000 guests come from all over the world. Conservative Laestadianism does mission work in 16 countries: Ecuador, Estonia, Finland, Germany, Great Britain, Hungary, Canada, Kenya, Latvia, Norway, Russia, Spain, Sweden, Switzerland, Togo and the United States.

Congregations in North America are located in the following provinces and states:

Canada: Alberta, British Columbia, Ontario and Saskatchewan.

USA: Alaska, Arizona, California, Colorado, Connecticut, Florida, Illinois, Michigan, Minnesota, Montana, North Dakota, Oregon, Washington, and Wyoming.

Child sex abuse scandal 
In 2011, the Finnish news media reported widespread child sexual abuse and coverup within Finnish Conservative Laestadianism occurring over at least 30 years that eventually led to many criminal cases including against several Laestadian lay preachers, resulting in lengthy prison terms.  Child welfare worker Johanna Hurtig, Ph.D., herself a Conservative Laestadian, allegedly uncovered the abuse in the course of her research on sex abuse in the Finnish Lutheran church as a whole.  After she was ridiculed and dismissed by the Finnish Conservative Laestadian leadership, Hurtig's findings were reported to the media, leading to wide scrutiny of the sect by the Finnish public.

Criticism of claims 
An article by Jani Kaaro from July 2015 entitled Laestadians - A Modern Witchhunt in Finnish publication Rapport, questions the methods used to build the cases against the church leaders by the Finnish criminal justice system, in particular alleging the possible planting of the false ideas in children's minds.

Associations and church
 Laestadian Lutheran Church (North America)
 SRK (Finland)
 SFC (Sweden and Norway)
 Eesti luterlik rahuühendus (Estonia)

Publications
Conservative Laestadians have five newspapers, three in Finland and two in North America. Those newspapers are translated into eight languages. The LLC publishes The Voice of Zion and The Shepherd´s Voice. (languages: English, Finnish, French and Spanish). The SRK in Finland publishes: Päivämies, Siionin Lähetyslehti and Lasten polku (previously Siionin Kevät). (Languages: Estonian, Finnish, English, German, Russian and Swedish). They have a song book, which has been translated into 7 languages. It is called Songs and Hymns of Zion. There is also a book which describes Conservative Laestadians' doctrine. The name of this book is "The Treasure Hidden in a Field" and it can be ordered from the LLC webstore. However, the Bible is their most important book.

Literature
 Treasure hidden in a field, 
 From Victory to Victory, SRK
 In the Footsteps of the Sheep, 
 By Faith, LLC
 God is Love, 
 The Storms Will Cease, 
 Aviva and the First Christmas, LLC

See also
 Laestadian Lutheran Church
 Association of Peace
 SRK, Suomen rauhanyhdistysten keskusyhdistys
 SFC, Sveriges fridsföreningarnas centralorganisation
 Eesti luterlik rahuühendus
 Laestadianism
 Laestadianism in America
 Lars Levi Laestadius

Sources

References

External links
 LLC
 SRK
 Writings from Siionin lähetyslehti (Sometimes in English)
 Writings from Siionin kevät (Sometimes in English)
 A historical study of the Laestadian Lutheran Church, the SRK, and Conservative Laestadianism.

Lutheranism in Finland
Lutheranism in Sweden
Lutheranism in Norway
Protestantism in Hungary
Religious organizations established in 1844
Laestadianism
Lutheran denominations